Allianz SpA v West Tankers is a preliminary ruling (case C185/07) by the Grand Chamber of the Court of Justice of the European Union upon a reference for a preliminary ruling from the United Kingdom's House of Lords. The case arose because in August 2000 the Front Comor, a vessel owned by West Tankers and chartered by Erg Petroli SpA (‘Erg’), collided in Syracuse (Italy) with a jetty also owned by Erg, causing damage to the jetty.

In its judgment issued on 10 February 2009, the court held that the validity of arbitration agreements falls within the scope of the Brussels Regulation, but that anti-suit injunctions restraining a party from commencing or continuing processed in the court of a Brussels Regulation member state cannot be granted.

In other words, the law of the Brussels Regulation does not allow a member state's court to give an order to restrain a person from commencing or continuing proceedings (the so-called anti-suit injunctions before the court of another member state on the ground that such proceedings would be contrary to the arbitration agreement. Member states must have mutual trust in one another and allowing anti-suit injunctions would undermine the effectiveness of the Regulation. However, a national court could grant an anti-suit injunction where the foreign proceedings were not in a Brussels Regulation state.

See also
 List of European Court of Justice rulings

References

Court of Justice of the European Union case law
2009 in case law